Three Threes Condiments is a condiments producer of Australia. Their products include:

Sweet mustard pickles (Spreadable and Chunky)
Pickled onions (Australian, Old Style and Honey Mustard)
Sweet Spiced Gherkins
Olives (Stuffed, Green, stuffed with fetta, stuffed with anchovies)
Giardiniera (mix of vegetables in brine)
Mint jelly
Apple sauce
Mightymite
Passionfruit Butter
Choc-Honey Spread
Mediterranean Antipasto Mix
Sundried Tomatoes in Olive Oil
Stuffed Vine Leaves (Dolmades)

See also

List of oldest companies in Australia

References

External links

Australian condiments
Brand name condiments
Food and drink companies established in 1919
Australian companies established in 1919
Companies based in Sydney
Privately held companies of Australia
Food and drink companies of Australia
Condiment companies
Yeast extract spreads